Larry Shears (born August 1, 1949) is a former American football defensive back. He played for the Atlanta Falcons from 1971 to 1972.

References

1949 births
Living people
Sportspeople from Mobile, Alabama
Players of American football from Alabama
American football defensive backs
Lincoln Blue Tigers football players
Atlanta Falcons players
New York Stars players
Charlotte Hornets (WFL) players